In Greek mythology, King Haemus (Haîmos) of Thrace, was the son of Boreas, the north wind.

Mythology 
Haemus was vain and haughty and compared himself and his wife, Queen Rhodope, to Zeus and Hera. The gods changed him and his wife into mountains (respectively Haemus Mons, now known as the Balkan Mountains, and the Rhodope Mountains). In ancient Greek, the Balkan Peninsula was thus known as the "Peninsula of Haemus", a name which retains some currency in modern Greek.

Another classic etymology derives the name 'Haemos' from the myth about the fight of Zeus and the dragon Typhon:

He was again driven to Thrace and hurled entire mountains at Zeus in the battle around Mount Haemus. When these bounced back upon him under the force of the thunderbolt, blood gushed out on the mountain. From this, they say, the mountain is called haemus ("bloody").

Notes 

Mythological kings of Thrace
Kings in Greek mythology
Metamorphoses into terrain in Greek mythology
Greek mythology of Thrace
Geography of ancient Thrace
History of the Balkans

References 

 Apollodorus, The Library with an English Translation by Sir James George Frazer, F.B.A., F.R.S. in 2 Volumes, Cambridge, MA, Harvard University Press; London, William Heinemann Ltd. 1921. ISBN 0-674-99135-4. Online version at the Perseus Digital Library. Greek text available from the same website.
 Publius Ovidius Naso, Metamorphoses translated by Brookes More (1859-1942). Boston, Cornhill Publishing Co. 1922. Online version at the Perseus Digital Library.
 Publius Ovidius Naso, Metamorphoses. Hugo Magnus. Gotha (Germany). Friedr. Andr. Perthes. 1892. Latin text available at the Perseus Digital Library.